Chinatown is a neighborhood on the South Side of Chicago, along S. Wentworth Avenue between Cermak Road and W. 26th St. Over a third of Chicago's Chinese population resides in this ethnic enclave, making it one of the largest concentrations of Chinese-Americans in the United States. It formed around 1912, after settlers moved south from near the Loop, where the first enclaves were established in the 19th century.

Chinatown is sometimes confused with an area on the city's North Side, "New Chinatown", which is largely populated by people of Southeast Asian heritage.

History

Initial migration and "old" Chinatown 
Looking to escape the anti-Chinese violence that had broken out on the west coast, the first Chinese arrived in Chicago after 1869 when the First transcontinental railroad was completed. Aside from ethnic violence, governments on the west coast had begun to systematically target Chinese, such as a 1870 San Francisco ordinance that taxed laundrymen who used horseless wagons for their deliveries. This discrimination on the west coast, in tandem with poor economic conditions at the time, led to intense Chinese migration to other areas of the United States. Further aiding this rapid migration was the fact that many Chinese lost their jobs after the completion of the transcontinental railroad, as they had made up 90% of the workforce for the Central Pacific Railroad.

At first, the Chinese in Chicago were largely welcomed by their fellow Chicagoans of all races. As early immigrant Moy Dong Chow would later state, "the Chicagoans found us a peculiar people to be sure, but they liked to mix with us." The willingness of Chinese Chicagoans to accept Christian missions in Chinatown also helped to ease tensions between the two groups. By 1909, there were two Christian missions in old Chinatown, and eight other missions dedicated to serving ethnic Chinese by 1909.

This acceptance led to a prospering early Chinese community in Chicago. By the late 1800s, 25% of Chicago's approximately 600 Chinese residents settled along Clark Street between Van Buren and Harrison Streets in Chicago's Loop. In the mid-1870s, the Kim Kee Company opened a store selling imported Chinese goods and ingredients, and in the basement of the same building stood a Chinese-owned restaurant. In 1889, 16 Chinese-owned businesses were located along the two-block stretch, including eight grocery stores, two butcher shops and a restaurant. Other businesses operated in the early Chinatown included gambling houses, headquarters of family associations, and Christian mission houses. Further, grocery stores in Chinatown could double as a cultural center, where people would gamble, consume rice wine, and smoke cigars. Laundry services were also quite important to the average working Chinese man in the original Chinatown, with 198 Chinese laundries by 1883. However, by 1897, white Chicagoans had begun to open laundry businesses as well. Many white laundrymen offered their services cheaper than the Chinese laundrymen, causing the leaders of Chinatown to declare "war" on the "cheap foreign labor" that was hurting Chinese laundry businesses in the area. By 1903, white Chicagoans also became highly interested in the increasingly popular "fad" of chop suey restaurants in Chinatown, with the cuisine developing a "mysterious" aura among whites. This helped lead to the opening of more restaurants on Clark Street.

By the turn of the century, numerous powerful clans and family associations rose up among the Chinese population in Chicago. The first and most powerful was the Moy clan, who were the de facto leaders of the Chinese in Chicago, and, even from this earlier period of migration, the Moy Family Association came to be the largest association in the city. From 1898 to 1940, there were over six thousand immigrant files in Chicago, and over one thousand of these files contained the name "Moy". Sam Moy was the first "mayor" of Chinatown, and he acted as an interpreter and interacted with city officials on behalf of the area. Besides the Moy clan, other major clans in early Chinatown were the Wong and Chin clans. The prevalence of just a few surnames reflects the phenomenon of chain migration and the continuing propensity of transnational ties that existed early on within Chinatown.

Following the 1906 San Francisco earthquake, Chinese Americans arrived in Chicago in droves and were vehemently supported by their fellow Chinese in the city, largely due to the preexisting clan associations who sought to take care of their kinsmen. The importance of clan ties for finding success in Chinatown continued for decades, with many clans financing businesses through fellow members of their family association or strictly hiring kinsmen to work in their businesses. The population of Chinese in Chicago more than doubled from 1890 to 1900, with many of these new migrants residing in the original Chinatown. In terms of ties to mainland China, the large majority of the early Chinese in Chicago were from Taishan, such as influential merchants Chin Foin and Moy Dong Chow.

Old Chinatown, like other highly-populated Chinatowns in cities across the country, was a major site of the Tong Wars, and there were several high profile incidents related to these wars throughout early Chinatown's history. In 1909, a large shootout broke out between different Tongs, leading to mass arrests. Later, in 1911 Lee Yip Wing and Moy Dong Tong were shot for failing to comply with demands by the Hip Sing Tong. The Tong Wars would continue for the next several decades, with Chicago and Chinatown constantly preparing for another outbreak of violence. For example, in 1930 extra police details were sent to Chinatown after a truce was called off between the warring parties.

Relocation South 

While Chinese in Chicago had been relatively welcomed by the locals in the past, the renewal of the Chinese Exclusion Act in 1892, in tandem with the World's Columbian Exposition in Chicago in 1893, brought a significant amount of discrimination to the Chinese population. Because of this, in 1912, the Chinese living in this area began moving south to Armour Square, with about half of all Chinese moving out of Clark Street into the South Side by this time. Some historians say this was due to increasing rent prices, as rents were significantly higher for Chinese businesses than similar white businesses. Others see more complex causes: discrimination, overcrowding, a high non-Chinese crime rate, and disagreements between the two associations ("tongs") within the community, the Hip Sing Tong and the On Leong Tong. Largely, however, the move was a result of multiple factors including racial prejudice, cultural bias, and economic competition. One such example of racial prejudice was incited by the murder of Elsie Sigel in New York City by a supposedly Chinese man, which made white residents in Chicago suspicious of the close relationship between white women and Chinese males in their own city. Yet another factor that precipitated the move further south was the impending construction of a federal building in the heart of the old Chinatown in 1911, which would require many Chinese-owned buildings to be demolished. By 1911, prominent Chinese men in Chicago were already negotiating with property holders about moving two miles south.

In response to this, the move to the new South Side Chinatown was led by the On Leong Merchants Association who, in 1912, had a building constructed along Cermak Road (then 22nd Street) that could house 15 stores, 30 apartments and the Association's headquarters. While the building's design was typical of the period, it also featured Chinese accents such as tile trim adorned with dragons. The total cost of the building was $200,000. In addition, the On Leong Merchants Association purchased a series of ten year leases to develop the surrounding area. Thus, starting in 1912, the area near Wentworth Avenue and Cermak Road was officially proclaimed the "New Chinatown". Even in the first year of this move south, Chinese in the new Chinatown faced significant discrimination from the established Italian community in Armor Square, causing them to restrict the new Chinatown to just one square block at 22nd Street and Princeton Avenue. This discrimination was a continuation of tensions that were present before the move south, when non-Chinese residents fearing a "yellow invasion" sought to block Chinese buying property in Armour Square.

The new Chinatown would come to hold over one-third of Chicago's two thousand strong Chinese population soon after its founding. Politically, many in new Chinatown were united in their strong support of the Republic of China. In 1919, a visit to Chinatown by Wang Chen Wei, the right hand man of the Republic’s first president Sun Yat-sen, produced a large parade with many Republican banners flying. As new Chinatown grew significantly, the old Chinatown was left largely empty of ethnic Chinese inhabitants. According to one contemporary journalist, by 1927 there were a hundred "for rent" signs on the windows of the old Chinatown, with only two Chinese businesses remaining.

In the 1920s, Chinese community leaders secured approximately 50 ten-year leases on properties in the newly developing Chinatown. Because of severe racial discrimination, these leases needed to be secured via an intermediary, H. O. Stone Company. Jim Moy, then-director of the On Leong Merchants Association, then decided that a Chinese-style building should be constructed as a strong visual announcement of the Chinese community's new presence in the area. With no Chinese-born architects in Chicago at the time, Chicago-born Norse architects Christian S. Michaelsen and Sigurd A. Rognstad were asked to design the new On Leong Merchants Association Building in spring 1926. Michaelsen and Rognstad drew their final design after studying texts on Chinese architecture. When the building opened in 1928 at a cost of a million dollars, it was the finest large Chinese-style structure in any North American Chinatown. While the overall structure of the building was fairly commonplace for the time, it was marked with two massive pagoda towers to frame it. The On Leong Association allowed the Chinese Consolidated Benevolent Association to put its headquarters in the new building and also used it as an immigrant assistance center, a school, a shrine, a meeting hall, and office space for the Association itself. It was often informally referred to as Chinatown's "city hall". 

Economically, by the 1930s, a large portion of Chinese businesses in the new Chinatown were large grocery stores stocking imported goods. Through transnational associations, these initial Chinese-owned stores substantiated a strong link between Chicago's Chinatown, other Chinatowns in the United States, and even East Asia itself. For example, the Moy-owned Hip Lung Yee Kee company on Wentworth Avenue facilitated communication between associations in San Francisco, Chicago, and Hong Kong. The grocery stores in Chinatown at this time also had a very important role locally. They employed over six hundred Chinese locals, and they functioned as hotels and banks as well. Otherwise, Chinese restaurants were supremely important to the economy of Chinatown in this period. By 1930, there were at least eleven restaurants located in the new Chinatown. Often, these restaurants were places of fine dining, and, because of this, they also acted as gathering places to connect Chinatown’s elites with the elites of Chicago in general. For example, Mong Long Fo's restaurant was the site of a publicized meeting between two members of the Moy clan and three of Chicago's white elite. Overall, however, the economic situation for many Chinese in the new Chinatown remained the same as in the old Chinatown. The majority of Chinatown's residents were poorly-educated immigrants who made their livings through low-skill, manual labor or through restaurant-related work. In turn, the wealthy merchant families still wielded immense power in the area, with the Moys wielding the most.

Numerous important buildings and structures in Chinatown arose in the area during this early period. The Canal Street railroad bridge, built in 1914, remains a tall vertical structure in the backdrop of Chinatown. The Hung Mun building in Chicago was and is still inhabited by the Chicago branch of the Hung Mun Association. While it only occupied the building starting in the 1920s, the local branch of the association played an active role in the 1911 revolution that founded the Chinese Republic. The Won Kow Building was built from 1926-1927 by the same architects that designed the On Leong Merchant Association Building. As can be expected, it shares many of the same design characteristics as the former building, and it has since housed a restaurant in the building that is the oldest restaurant in Chinatown. Finally, reflecting the prominence of the Moy clan once again, the Moy Association Building still stands as one of the more impressive and beautiful buildings in Chinatown. It was originally built in 1928 and added onto in 1932. Like the On Leong Merchant Association Building and the Won Kow Building, the Moy Association building was designed by Michaelsen and Rognstad.

Post-World War II Chinatown 

Before World War II, Chicago's Chinatown remained a largely insulated enclave, with little of the racial mixing seen in cities such as New York City. The residents only grew closer together from the war as they collectively united against fascism. However, this unity increasingly became frayed in the years that followed. The influx of refugees and educated Chinese into Chicago dramatically changed the importance of Chinatown to Chicago's Chinese residents. Instead of living and working in Chinatown, many newcomers decided to move to the suburbs. Further, as Chinese immigration came to be more accepted following the passing of the Immigration and Nationality Act of 1965, young, educated Chinese Americans began to take a greater role in Chinatown, clashing with the old family associations.

In an effort to improve connectivity between Chinese throughout the city, construction began on the Chinatown Gateway in 1975, meant to act as a symbol of unity and encourage greater cultural exchange between Chinese. During the late 1980s, a group of Chinatown business leaders bought  of property north of Archer Avenue from the Santa Fe Railway and built Chinatown Square, a two-level mall consisting of restaurants, beauty salons and law offices, flanked by 21 new townhouses. Additional residential construction, such as the Santa Fe Gardens, a 600-unit village of townhouses, condominiums and single-family homes was developed on formerly industrial land to the north. Perhaps the most outstanding feature of the new addition was the creation of Ping Tom Memorial Park in 1999; located on the bank of the Chicago River, the park features a Chinese-style pavilion that many consider to be the most beautiful in the Midwest.

Commerce

Chicago's Chinatown is home to a number of banks, Chinese restaurants, gift shops, grocery stores, Chinese medicine stores, as well as a number of services that cater to people interested in Chinese culture, including those speaking varieties of Chinese, especially Cantonese. It is a community hub for Chinese people in the Chicago metropolitan area, a business center for Chinese in the Midwest, as well as a popular destination for tourists and locals alike.

Demographics
In 1990, about 10,000 Chinese lived in Chinatown's business district and the area south of 26th Street; several Italian Americans still remained in the neighborhood.

, about 8,000 people lived within Chinatown itself, and 90% were ethnic Chinese. As of that year, many of the residents were elderly.

In 2010, about 16,325 people lived within Chinatown.

Landmarks and attractions

 Chinatown Mural, a mural showing the history of Chinese immigrants in United States
 Chinatown Square, Shopping area opened in 1993. Decorated with sculptures of animals in the Chinese zodiac
 Wentworth Avenue, with shopping, restaurants, and landmarks, including the Chinatown Gate
 Pui Tak Center was designated a Chicago Landmark on December 1, 1993.  It was the On Leong Merchants Association Building.
 Chinese American Museum of Chicago, conducts research and exhibits objects and pictures relating to the history of Chinese in the American Midwest. The museum experienced a fire on September 19, 2008, and was temporarily closed. Thanks to strong community support, it reopened in the fall of 2010 with improved facilities.
 Ping Tom Memorial Park, Opened in 1999 with Chinese gardens on the northern edge of Chinatown along the Chicago River
 Chicago Fire Department Engine 8 Company firehouse, firehouse used in the 1991 Ron Howard film Backdraft
 Chinatown Gate, which spans Wentworth Avenue at the intersection of Cermak Road, designed by Peter Fung
Moy Association Building, built in 1928 and added onto in 1932.

Government and infrastructure
The United States Postal Service operates the Chinatown Post Office at 2345 South Wentworth Avenue.

Education

Primary and secondary schools

Residents are zoned to schools in the Chicago Public Schools including John C. Haines School and Phillips Academy High School.

Haines, which had its current facility built in 1994, serves students from Chinatown and formerly from the Harold L. Ickes Homes; students from the latter used a tunnel to get to school.  70% of the students were Asian while 28% were black; most residents of Ickes were black. Connie Laureman of the Chicago Tribune stated that Haines, in 1990, was "crowded and dilapidated". Until Gandy Easton became principal in 1990, the school had de facto racial segregation as ethnic Chinese students stayed in a bilingual program while black students took regular classes. Easton combined the two levels together, despite protests from ethnic Chinese parents. By 2001 school authorities instituted programs to combat racism and ensure Chinese and black students socialized with one another.

The Roman Catholic Archdiocese of Chicago supports the St. Therese Chinese Catholic School, a K-8 private Catholic school, which has one of its two campuses in Chinatown. It was established in 1941. In 1990, almost all of the students were ethnic Chinese.

The Pui Tak Christian School is a private pre-kindergarten to 8th grade school.

Public libraries

The Chicago Public Library operates the Chinatown Library at 2100 South Wentworth Avenue.

Culture

A 1942 article from the Chicago Tribune stated that the strong family ties among the residents of Chinatown meant that there was little juvenile delinquency present in the community.

Chicago Chinatown celebrates the founding of  the Republic of China with the Double Ten Parade, which includes lion dances and much display of the flag of Taiwan. 

Chicago Chinatown also celebrates the National Day of the People's Republic of China  with members of the PRC consulate.

Transportation
The Dan Ryan Expressway and the Stevenson Expressway intersect over the southside of Chinatown. The Stevenson's exit 293A (northbound exit and southbound entrances) gives Chinatown commuters immediate access to the expressways via Cermak Road, only one block east of Wentworth Avenue. There is metered street parking throughout the area, as well as two pay parking lots located on Wentworth Avenue.

Several forms of public transportation are also available in Chinatown. The Chicago Transit Authority operates both an elevated train and four bus routes that service the area. The Red Line, the CTA's busiest transit route, stops 24/7 at the Cermak–Chinatown station located in the heart of Chinatown near the corner of Cermak Road and Wentworth Avenue. Running north–south, the #24 bus route runs on Wentworth Avenue on the eastside of Chinatown, while the #44 route runs on Canal Street on the westside. The #21 runs east–west on Cermak Road, and the #62 runs southwest–northeast on Archer Avenue. There is a taxicab stand on Wentworth Avenue, and a water taxi service also runs along the Chicago River from Michigan Avenue to Ping Tom Memorial Park in Chinatown during the summer months.

Annual events
 Chinatown 5K
 Chinese New Year Festival
 Dragon Boat Races

See also
 Chinese in Chicago

References

Further reading

External links

Chicago Chinese American Historical Society
Chinese–American Museum of Chicago
Chicago Chinatown Chamber of Commerce
John C. Haines Elementary School - K-8 school of Chicago's Chinatown
Explore Chicago Collections

Neighborhoods in Chicago
South Side, Chicago
Asian-American culture in Chicago
Chinese-American culture in Illinois
Chicago
Populated places established in 1912
1912 establishments in Illinois
Tourist attractions in Chicago
Armour Square, Chicago